This is a list of Maldivian films released in 2016.

Releases

Theatrical releases

References

External links

Maldivian
2016